Nauvoo (from the ) is a small city in Hancock County, Illinois, United States, on the Mississippi River near Fort Madison, Iowa. The population of Nauvoo was 950 at the 2020 census. Nauvoo attracts visitors for its historic importance and its religious significance to members of several groups: The Church of Jesus Christ of Latter-day Saints; the Community of Christ, formerly the Reorganized Church of Jesus Christ of Latter Day Saints (RLDS); other groups stemming from the Latter Day Saint movement; and the Icarians. The city and its immediate surrounding area are listed on the National Register of Historic Places as the Nauvoo Historic District.

History

The area of Nauvoo was first called Quashquema, named in honor of the Native American chief who headed a Sauk and Fox settlement numbering nearly 500 lodges. By 1827, white settlers had built cabins in the area. By 1829 this area of Hancock County had grown sufficiently so that a post office was needed and in 1832 the town, by then called Venus, was one of the contenders for the new county's seat. However, the honor was awarded to a nearby city, Carthage. In 1834 the name Venus was changed to Commerce because the settlers felt the new name better suited their plans.

In late 1839, arriving Latter Day Saints bought the small town and in April 1840 it was renamed Nauvoo by Joseph Smith, who led the Latter Day Saints to Nauvoo to escape conflict with the state government in Missouri. The name Nauvoo is derived from the traditional Hebrew language with an anglicized spelling. The word comes from Isaiah 52:7, "How beautiful upon the mountains..." By 1844 "Nauvoo's population had swollen to 12,000, rivaling the size of Chicago" at the time.

After Joseph Smith's death in 1844, continued violence from surrounding non-LDS members forced most Latter-Day Saints to leave Nauvoo. Most of these followers, led by Brigham Young, emigrated to the Great Salt Lake Valley. In 1849, Icarians moved to the Nauvoo area to implement a utopian socialist commune based on the ideals of French philosopher Étienne Cabet. The colony had nearly 500 members at its peak, but Cabet's death in 1856 led some members to leave this parent colony. 

After the departure of the Icarians, Nauvoo became the largest German-speaking community in Illinois and remained so for fifty years. German was spoken widely in town and in the Catholic, Lutheran, Presbyterian and Methodist churches.  During the Germanic era, wine-making and fruit production thrived in Nauvoo. Notable residents from this era include the Swiss memoirist Heinrich Lienhard. During World War I, most of Nauvoo's native-German speaking residents stopped using German in public, and the use of German entirely faded away by the Second World War.   

In the early and mid 20th century Nauvoo was primarily a Roman Catholic town. Today, a plurality of the population is Methodist or another Christian faith.

Nauvoo today

On the city's higher ground are the temple, residential areas, and the business district along Mulholland Street (Illinois Route 96), much of it devoted to the needs of tourists and those interested in Latter Day Saint history. The flatlands are occupied by a small number of 19th-century brick houses and other buildings that have survived the city's vicissitudes, with large empty spaces between them where houses and whole neighborhoods have disappeared.

Community of Christ owns much of the southern end of the flatlands and maintains several key historic sites in and around Nauvoo, including the Joseph Smith Homestead, the Nauvoo House, the Red Brick Store, the Mansion House, and the Smith Family Cemetery. Guided tours are available at the church's Joseph Smith Historic Site, at the south end of the town and accessible from Highway 96.

The Church of Jesus Christ of Latter-Day Saints owns most of the other historic sites in Nauvoo, including the homes of Brigham Young, Heber C. Kimball, and other early members of the church, as well as other significant buildings. Most of these sites are open to the public, with demonstrations and displays, and there are self-guided driving tours as well as wagon tours. These tours are free, as are the stage and riverside theatrical productions. There is a large visitors' center complete with two theaters and a relief map of 1846 Nauvoo.

The creation of Nauvoo as a historical tourism destination was largely a result of the work of J. LeRoy Kimball (1901–1992). Kimball was a descendant of early LDS leader Heber C. Kimball, and bought his ancestor's home in 1954 with the intention of restoring it. He was the president of Nauvoo Restoration, Inc. from 1962 to 1986.

A Church of Jesus Christ of Latter-Day Saints congregation was established in Nauvoo in 1956, from its inception consisting largely of elderly LDS couples serving as missionaries and historical guides. The City of Joseph pageant, an outdoor musical produced by the Church of Jesus Christ of Latter-Day Saints, began to run each summer in 1976. A stake was organized with headquarters at Nauvoo in 1979.  In addition to the many homes that had been restored, the Relief Society Memorial Garden was dedicated in 1978, featuring statues designed by Dennis Smith and Florence Hansen.

In June 2002, the Church of Jesus Christ of Latter-Day Saints completed construction of a new temple on the site of the original temple. The exterior, and much of the interior, is a copy of the original.

The rebuilding of the Nauvoo Temple was an occasion of great joy and enthusiasm for members of the Church of Jesus Christ of Latter-Day Saints. During the public open house prior to its dedication, 331,849 visitors toured the building. Following 
Church custom, the temple is now used only by Church members.

The work to renovate various sites of historical significance in the area is coordinated by Nauvoo Restoration, Incorporated. NRI is a nonprofit organization supported by the Church of Jesus Christ of Latter-Day Saints and Community of Christ, as well as others interested in Nauvoo's history. Due to the work of NRI and its members, Nauvoo has been dubbed the "Williamsburg of the Midwest." In March 2007, Nauvoo was nominated to compete as one of the Seven Wonders of Illinois.

The Church of Jesus Christ of Latter-Day Saints sponsors numerous activities throughout the year in Nauvoo including The Nauvoo Pageant (July/August). The 2020 pageant was cancelled due to the COVID-19 pandemic. The community sponsors the Grape Festival (Labor Day weekend) and Pumpkin Walk (October).

Because most of the city is well above flood level, Nauvoo has not historically had problems when the Mississippi river has risen. In both the floods of 1993 and 2008, very little damage was sustained within city limits.

Nauvoo has many places of worship, among them: United Methodist Church, St Peter & Paul Catholic Church,  Cornerstone of Zion Church, Living Hope Church (Non-denominational), a Community of Christ (Formerly known as The Reorganized Church of Jesus Christ of Latter Day Saints), and three wards of the Church of Jesus Christ of Latter-Day Saints.

Geography

Nauvoo is at  (40.5446, −91.3803). Situated on a wide bend in the Mississippi River, Nauvoo has most of the historic district in the lower flat lands (called the flats) that are no more than a few feet above the water line. A prominent hill rises as one moves further east, at the apex of which stands the rebuilt Nauvoo Temple. Beginning with the temple, this elevated land (called the uptown) continues flat for many miles eastward.

Demographics

Non-census data indicates that the population of Nauvoo grew from 100 in 1839 to about 4,000 in 1842, 12,000 in 1844, and stood at about 11,000 in 1845.

2010

At the 2010 census, 1,149 people, 494 households, and 351 families resided in the city. The city's racial makeup was 97.7% White, 0.6% African American, 0.3% Native American, 0.6% from other races, and 0.9% from two or more races. Hispanic or Latino of any race were 1.60% of the population.

There were 494 households, of which 20.0% had children under the age of 18, 60.9% were married couples living together, 7.7% had a female householder with no husband present and 28.9% were non-families. 28.9% of households were one person and 12.5% were one person aged 65 or older. The average household size was 2.28 and the average family size was 2.70.

The age distribution was 19.9% under the age of 18 and 29.9% 65 or older. The median age was 51.6 years. The population was 47.5% male and 52.5% female.

The city's median household income was $37,216, and the median family income was $56,250. The city's per capita income was $26,210. About 6.6% of the population were below the poverty line, including 9.5% of those between ages 18 and 64, and 6.3% of those age 65 or over.

2000

At the 2000 census 1,063 people, 403 households, and 276 families resided in the city. The city's racial makeup was 97.08% White, 0.28% African American, 0.47% Native American, 0.19% Asian, 0.94% from other races, and 1.03% from two or more races. Hispanic or Latino of any race were 1.60%.

There were 403 households, of which 28.0% had children under the age of 18, 58.3% were married couples living together, 6.9% had a female householder with no husband present and 31.3% were non-families. 28.5% of households were one person and 16.4% were one person aged 65 or older. The average household size was 2.46 and the average family size was 3.04.

The age distribution was 24.6% under the age of 18, 6.5% from 18 to 24, 21.9% from 25 to 44, 24.0% from 45 to 64, and 23.0% 65 or older. The median age was 43 years. For every 100 females, there were 88.5 males. For every 100 females age 18 and over, there were 79.8 males.

The city's median household income was $39,519, and the median family income was $49,167. Males had a median income of $37,895 versus $24,250 for females. The city's per capita income was $18,150. About 5.6% of families and 12.8% of the population were below the poverty line, including 16.2% of those under age 18 and 18.2% of those age 65 or over.

Economy

The Nauvoo Blue Cheese company began to produce cheese in the 1930s. It was discovered the cool, moist wine cellars in the area were ideal for aging cheese. The wine cellars, and the wine-making business originally started by the Icarians, saw a decline in use because of prohibition. In 2003 the Nauvoo Cheese company went out of business when Saputo food company purchased it and relocated to other facilities.

Nauvoo is also home to Baxter's Vineyards, a small family-owned winery begun in 1857 by Emile Baxter that is Illinois' oldest established winery.

Tourism is the major industry in Nauvoo, with Nauvoo Restoration Inc., employing approximately 30, while an estimated 200 missionaries (unpaid) from the Church of Jesus Christ of Latter-Day Saints also provide a boost to local businesses during the tourist season.

Due to lack of sustainable industries, the city has lost several key businesses and services including the High School and multiple small businesses.

Government and politics 
Nauvoo City government consists of the Mayor and five city council members. The position of City Clerk is also elected.  Additionally, there are appointed positions for City Treasurer, Chief of Police, and Public Works positions.  As of April 2021, the mayor is Jason Skog. The aldermen are Tacy Anozie, Jim Boyles, Brenda Adkisson, Jeff Christensen, and Larry Nichol.

Separate from the city are the Nauvoo Fire Protection District (FPD) and Nauvoo-Colusa School System. The Nauvoo FPD covers all of the city plus the surrounding five townships. The fire department currently provides both fire and EMS coverage for its district. In 1991 the Nauvoo FPD became a BLS non-transporting agency, relying on the county ambulance service to transport patients to local hospitals. Because of longer response times from county-run ambulances, the citizens of the Nauvoo FPD passed a referendum by 74% on April 17, 2007, for ambulance services that would transfer the ambulance tax money to the FPD that was being paid to the county. The Nauvoo FPD completed its fundraising efforts on November 30, 2007, to purchase its ambulance, which entered service in January 2008.

Education

The Nauvoo-Colusa Community Unit School District 325 runs the local elementary and junior high school. Prior to 2008 high school residents attended Nauvoo-Colusa High School from 1961 to 2008. Since 2008 residents have attended Warsaw Community Unit School District 316's Warsaw High School.

Nauvoo is also home to the private Sts. Peter & Paul Catholic School which provides a faith based education for students from preschool through 7th grade.

Notable people

See also

 History of Nauvoo, Illinois
 Nauvoo Neighbor
 Nauvoo Expositor
Times and Seasons
The Wasp (newspaper)

References

Bibliography

External links

  City of Nauvoo
 Nauvoo Chamber of Commerce
 Historic Nauvoo – information on historic sites, demonstrations, and calendar of events.
 

 
Populated places established in 1840
Cities in Illinois
Illinois populated places on the Mississippi River
Mormonism-related controversies
Cities in Hancock County, Illinois
Significant places in Mormonism
Utopian communities in the United States
Christian communities